Anna-Liisa Hyvönen (29 July 1926 – 1 December 2021) was a Finnish politician. A member of the Finnish People's Democratic League, she served in the Parliament of Finland from 1972 to 1980.

References

1926 births
2021 deaths
20th-century Finnish politicians
Finnish People's Democratic League politicians
Politicians from Helsinki
Members of the Parliament of Finland (1972–75)
Members of the Parliament of Finland (1975–79)
20th-century Finnish women politicians